Featuring "Birds" is the third studio album by American indie rock band Quasi. It was released in 1998 by record label Up in the US and Domino in the UK.

Recording 

Featuring "Birds" was recorded during December 1997 at Jackpot Studio in Portland, Oregon.

Release 

Featuring "Birds" was released on April 21, 1998 by record label Up in the US and Domino in the UK.

Reception 

Featuring "Birds" has been well received by critics.

Sean Kennerly of Rolling Stone wrote: "[the album] hides gut-wrenching heartache and despair inside sugary vocal harmonies and catchy, succinct songwriting. [...] Bitterness has never sounded so sweet." The album placed at number twenty-five on The Village Voice's 1998 end-of-year Pazz & Jop poll.

Track listing

Personnel 
Sam Coomes – vocals, guitar, Roxichord, keyboards
Janet Weiss – vocals, drums
Charlie Campbell – orchestral guitar on "Tomorrow You'll Hide", executive producer
Quasi – production
Joanna Bolme – executive producer
Larry Crane – recording engineer, executive producer
Tony Lash – executive producer, mastering
Dave Livingston – executive producer
Kathy Malloy – executive producer
Chris Slusarenko – executive producer
Elliott Smith – executive producer
Chris Takino – executive producer
Julie Weiss – executive producer

References 

1998 albums
Quasi albums
Domino Recording Company albums
Albums produced by Larry Crane (recording engineer)